Manny Aulakh (born 17 November 1991) is a Canadian international cricketer who plays for the Canada national cricket team. Aulakh is a right-hand batsman and bowls right arm fast-medium.

Career
Aulakh made his first-class cricket debut against the Ireland national cricket team on 13 September 2011. He also played in T20I cricket completions against the Scotland national cricket team.

References

External links

1991 births
Living people
Canadian cricketers
Canada Twenty20 International cricketers
Canada One Day International cricketers
Canadian people of Punjabi descent
Indian emigrants to Canada
Indian cricketers
People from Bathinda
Cricketers from Punjab, India